Risteska is a surname. Notable people with the surname include:

Elena Risteska (born 1986), sometimes known as simply Elena, Macedonian singer
Hristina Risteska (born 1991), Macedonian sprinter